"Be Easy" is the second single from T.I.'s album Trap Muzik. The song is about the life of a man in the projects. The song peaked at number 55 on the US Hot R&B/Hip-Hop Songs chart.

Music video
The video is about a man who was shot, and left for dead. The video starts off with the man receiving CPR from paramedics. The video then begins and the whole incident begins in reverse, from the man getting CPR to the man leaving his house.

The beginning of the video is where T.I. was "playing" the piano to the beat of the song and appears to be walking and doing everything backwards.

The second portion of the video "Look What I Got" contained cameo appearances such as Eightball & MJG, Killer Mike, P$C & CeeLo Green. The scene appears to be a parking lot with a crowd of people.

Track listing

A-side
1. Amended
2. Instrumental

B-side
1. Explicit
2. Amended a cappella

Charts

Weekly charts

References

2003 singles
Grand Hustle Records singles
T.I. songs
Song recordings produced by DJ Toomp
Atlantic Records singles
Songs written by T.I.